General Stevenson (1875–1961) was an English footballer. General Stevenson may also refer to:

Carter L. Stevenson (1817–1888), Confederate States Army major general
James Stevenson (East India Company officer) (died 1805), British East India Company major general
John D. Stevenson (United States Air Force general) (1914–1995), U.S. Air Force general
John Dunlap Stevenson (1821–1897), Union Army brigadier general and brevet major general
John Rowlstone Stevenson (1908–1971), Australian Army major general
Mitchell H. Stevenson (born 1952), U.S. Army lieutenant general
Nathaniel Stevenson (1840–1911), British Army general
Thomas G. Stevenson (1836–1864), Union Army brigadier general